Gilbert Charles Harding (5 June 1907 – 16 November 1960) was a British journalist and radio and television personality. His many careers included schoolmaster, journalist, policeman, disc jockey, actor, interviewer and television presenter. He also appeared in several films, sometimes in character parts but usually as himself – for example in Expresso Bongo (1959).

Harding had a sizeable role alongside John Mills in the 1952 film The Gentle Gunman, and narrated the introduction to the film Pacific Destiny (1956). He also made a couple of comedy records in the 1950s.

Early life
Harding was born in Hereford where his parents were employed as "master" and "matron" of the city's workhouse.  His father, also called Gilbert Harding, died in 1911 aged 30 following an appendicitis operation, and so his mother placed their son into the care of the Royal Orphanage of Wolverhampton.

Harding's education continued at Queens' College, Cambridge, after which he took jobs teaching English in Canada and France. He returned to Britain and worked as a policeman in Bradford, before taking a position as The Times correspondent in Cyprus. In 1936 he again returned to Britain and began a long-term career with the BBC.

BBC career
He was a regular on BBC Radio's Twenty Questions and was voted Personality of the Year in the National Radio Awards of 1953-4. Harding regularly appeared on the BBC television panel game What's My Line? as a panellist, having been the presenter of the very first episode in 1951.

Harding was notorious for his irascibility and was at one time characterised in the tabloid press as "the rudest man in Britain". His fame sprang from an inability to suffer fools gladly, and many 1950s TV viewers watched What's My Line? less for the quiz elements than for the chance of a live Harding outburst. An incident on an early broadcast started this trend when Harding became annoyed with a contestant, and told him that he was getting bored with him. Harding's rudeness off-screen was also commented upon; at a wedding reception at which a guest remarked that the bride and groom would make an ideal couple, Harding replied "You should know, you've slept with both of them". He became increasingly unable to move anywhere in public without being accosted by adoring viewers. On one occasion he asked a mother with two children if "your children are crippled", because they had stayed seated on a railway bench.

In 1960 he was reduced to tears on an edition of the Face to Face series, after being questioned by the host John Freeman. As the focus of the interview moved on to the subject of death, Freeman asked Harding if he had ever been in the presence of a dead person. At this point, in replying in the affirmative, Harding's voice began to break and his eyes watered. Freeman later said he had not anticipated the effect this would have; Harding had witnessed his mother's death in 1954. Freeman appeared to be unaware that Harding was referring to his mother, for later in the interview he asserted that Harding's mother was still alive. Harding contradicted him, and Freeman moved quickly on. This version of events has been contradicted by the producer, Hugh Burnett.

Freeman publicly expressed regret about this line of questioning; its emphasis on Harding's "closeness" to his mother has since been seen by at least one commentator as a tactless attempt to expose his homosexuality, though the viewing public did not become aware of it, and he was seen as merely a lonely bachelor. Harding kept his sexuality secret because male homosexual behaviour was a criminal offence in the UK. Harding also admitted in the programme that his bad manners and temper were "indefensible". "[I'm] profoundly lonely", he stated, later adding, "I would very much like to be dead."

Death
Harding died a few weeks after the Face to Face programme was broadcast, collapsing outside Broadcasting House as he was about to climb into a taxi. The cause was an asthma attack. He was 53 years old.

He was buried in St. Mary's Roman Catholic Cemetery, Kensal Green, west London.

Media
Behind Harding's gruff exterior there was a lonely and complex man who constantly donated to charity, visited the sick and helped many in need. But such details, in conflict with the public image, became public only after his death. In 1979, radio presenter Owen Spencer-Thomas on BBC Radio London's Gilbert Harding described him as "enigmatic ... bad-tempered and rude, yet his friends counted him as one of the kindest, and most generous."

The Face to Face interview was rebroadcast on BBC Four on 18 October 2005, following a repeated episode of What's My Line?. It was also broadcast in part on the BBC Four series 'Talk at the BBC'. A three-hour programme, The Rudest Man in Britain, was broadcast on BBC Radio 4 Extra in 2014 and has been repeated several times. This included interviews with people who knew and worked with Harding, and explored his life, personality, sexuality and influence in a non-judgemental way. It included the Face to Face interview in full, as well as episodes of programmes in which Harding was either Chairman or panel member. It ended with Stephen Wyatt's play Dr Brighton and Mr Harding.

References and sources
References

Sources
 Harding, Gilbert. (1953) Along My Line. London: Putnam (autobiography)

External links
Russ J. Graham, "Gilbert Harding" at TV Heroes.
Andrew Roberts, "Harding, Gilbert (1907–1960)" at ScreenOnline, British Film Institute.
Image of Gilbert Harding

1907 births
1960 deaths
Alumni of Queens' College, Cambridge
BBC people
Burials at St Mary's Catholic Cemetery, Kensal Green
Deaths from asthma
English male journalists
English radio personalities
English Roman Catholics
English television personalities
British LGBT broadcasters
LGBT DJs
British LGBT journalists
People educated at the Royal Wolverhampton School
People from Hereford
writers from Wolverhampton
Writers from London
20th-century English LGBT people